The Kawasaki YPX was a twinjet airliner proposed by Kawasaki Aerospace Company of Japan. The YPX was based on the Kawasaki P-1 aircraft developed for the Japan Maritime Self-Defense Force, but with two engines instead of four.

Design and development
The YPX was to have seated between 100 and 150 passengers, and would thus have been competitive with the smaller Boeing 737 and Airbus A320 family jets on short haul routes. The engine choice had not been made at the time its development was halted. Entry into service was expected to have been somewhere around 2015. However, no prototype has been built.

Kawasaki had hoped to cut fuel costs of up to 15% in comparison to the Boeing 737.

According to specifications issued in 2007, the base model YPX-11 was to have seated 113 passengers in a two-class arrangement. The YPX-10 was to have seated 93 in two classes while the YPX-12 was to have accommodated 137, implying about 150 in an all-economy arrangement. Standard range for all three body lengths would have been 4,260 km (2,300 nautical miles) but the YPX-10 and YPX-11 were to have extended-range sub-variants flying as far as 5,930 km (3,200 nautical miles).

The YPX was to have a five-abreast economy cabin and an elliptical cross-section - that is, with a smoothly varying radius, rather than the old double-bubble based on two distinct radii. Economy seats would be 46 cm (18 in) wide; the aisle, 51 cm (20 in).

Specifications

See also

References

External links
 Kawasaki YPX rendering
 Kawasaki YPX scale model

YPX
Abandoned civil aircraft projects